La Coche Power Station (French: Centrale de la Coche), also known as Sainte-Hélène la Coche, is a hydroelectric power plant in the commune of Aigueblanche (near Moûtiers), in Savoie, France. It is one of the six main pumped-storage hydropower plants in France.

Design 
This subterranean power station uses both pumped-storage and the gravity of natural stream flow to generate electricity through four reversible Francis turbine generator assemblies. The water is first taken from La Coche Reservoir (Cuvette de la Coche), then passes through the power station, and finally drains into the Aigueblanche Dam on the Isère River.

The four turbines then permit the water to be pumped from the Aigueblanche Dam (also known as the Echelles d'Annibal Dam) back up to the reservoir at a  elevation.

La Coche Power Station was originally a prototype for the Grand'Maison Dam, which also functions as a pumped-storage system. La Coche's installed power capacity is 320 Megawatts.

Water sources 
The water then descends  through this conduit to the power station's turbines.

There are eight water intake points that feed the reservoir, located on the following rivers: Bridan and Nant-Pérou, Eau Rousse, Morel, Nant Brun and Encombres, Belleville, and Allues.

See also 

 Renewable energy in France

References

External links 

 EDF Optimization Plan for La Coche Power Station, with images
 Hydrelect: La Coche - Sainte-Hélène Pumped-Storage Power Station, with images (in French)

Pumped-storage hydroelectric power stations in France
Hydroelectric power stations in France
Reservoirs in France
Buildings and structures in Savoie
Dams in France
Dams completed in 1975
Energy infrastructure completed in 1975
1975 establishments in France
Landforms of Auvergne-Rhône-Alpes
20th-century architecture in France